Saksenaea is a genus of fungi in the Saksenaeaceae family. First described in 1953, the genus contains two pathogenic species capable of causing severe human infections.

References

Zygomycota genera